Starlicide or gull toxicant is a chemical avicide that is highly toxic to European starlings (thus the name) and gulls, but less toxic to other birds or to mammals such as humans and pets.

Synonyms 
The name Starlicide originated as a registered trademark of the animal feed manufacturer Ralston-Purina in St. Louis, Missouri. Starlicide is a small molecule in which a central benzene ring is modified by amine, chloro and methyl substituents in a specific pattern.  Because special names exist for benzene rings modified with one or two of these functional groups, several synonymous chemical names may be encountered: 3-chloro-4-methylaniline or 3-chloro-4-methylbenzenamine, 2-chloro-4-aminotoluene, or 3-chloro-p-toluidine.  Numbered groups (2-chloro, 4-amino) also may be named out of order; the numbers of such groups equal the number of carbon atoms in the benzene ring separating them from the group implied in the special name.

Preparations of this chemical may be named as a hydrochloride (e.g. "3-chloro-p-toluidine hydrochloride", CPTH), indicating that hydrochloric acid has been used to neutralize the molecule to a salt in which the amine group is protonated and a chloride counterion is present; otherwise the free base is indicated.  The chemical salt is also known as DRC-1339.

Use 
Starlicide is lethal to starlings with an acute oral  of 3.8 milligrams per kilogram body weight, but it is less toxic to most other birds.  Grain-eating game birds such as bobwhite quail, pheasants (Phasianus colchicus) and rooks (Corvus frugilegus) are also vulnerable.  Hawks and mammals (only exception are cats) are resistant to the poison.  Starlings are killed in a slow, "nonviolent" death by uremic poisoning and congestion of major organs.  The effect is described as "a grayish white, frost-like material of uric acid overlaying the serosal surfaces of the various organs, accompanied by sterile inflammation and necrosis in the affected and adjacent tissues" akin to avian visceral gout.  The site of action is believed to be in the kidney.

Uses for CPTH include killing blackbirds on sprouting rice and on corn and soybean fields.  For these and other uses the poison is often given with brown rice.  Research continues to improve the effectiveness of delivery on brown rice by causing the poison to be retained on the bait longer and resist degradation by sunlight.  The effect of the poison is believed to be cumulative: for example, the LC50 for starlings was 4.7 ppm over 30 days, but only 1.0 ppm when fed for 90 days.

In New Zealand Starlicide is used for rook control.

In 2009, a culling with starlicide received national attention after USDA employees dispensed the poison in Griggstown, New Jersey, to kill an estimated 5,000 starlings that plagued feed lots and dairies on local farms. When "it began raining birds", community members became alarmed, unsure whether a toxin or disease was at work.  Two property owners in the area reported collecting more than 150 birds each from their land.

In January 2011, there was another incident in Yankton, South Dakota, causing public alarm. The USDA had poisoned the birds in Nebraska to protect farmers' feeds. African countries use it to control house crows.

Ecological impacts
Starlicide can and does kill nontarget species of birds that eat at feedlots and other places it is used.  However, this rarely occurs because of the places that Starlicide is used. Rusty blackbirds (Euphagus carolinus), once an abundant species that is declining precipitously, have been theorized to be declining as a result of the use of Starlicide.  However, this issue has been analyzed and found to be non-significant and not discussed by Avery (2013).  Rusty blackbirds primarily feed on invertebrates in wet woodlands and near streams throughout the year.  Even though they roost with other blackbirds, Rusty Blackbirds usually will not feed with them. Rusty blackbirds are a species not likely to be taken protecting crops because they mostly feed in wet woodland bottoms on acorns, pine seeds, fruits, and animal matter during winter, but sometimes will be found in feedlots (Avery 2013).  Even at the highest potential nontarget take with Starlicide, few, if any, would be taken and not a cause a decline in their population.  Habitat issues, possibly on their Canadian breeding habitat and on wintering grounds in the southeastern United States such as the decline of wetlands, is likely the primary reason for their decline. But, as poisoned birds may fly long distance before they die, it's difficult to find carcasses and results of studies may underestimate mortality, this had been shown in studying effectiveness of poison to control ravens.
There is opinion that reduction of starlings benefit native birds, which nest in cavities, and opposite, that reduction can cause increase of insect pests and reduce food for raptors. However, there is not enough verified data to support both claims, because studies of starlicide use were focused on direct mortality and didn't include indirect effects.
In Samoa use of Starlicide for myna control causes native bird mortality and increase of chlorine in water and, despite mynas pose some threat for native birds, risk-benefit ratio for ecosystem is uncertain.
Despite it considered harmless for raptors in both primary and secondary poisoning issues, it can affect them indirectly.
Use of Starlicide (known locally as F-1) in Hungary to control rook population had caused decline of red-footed falcon, which relies upon rooks for nesting and so pesticide was banned.

See also 
 Diclofenac

References 

Avicides
Chlorobenzenes
Anilines